Grizzly Bear Lake is located in Grand Teton National Park, in the U. S. state of Wyoming. The lake is not on a designated trail and is in a less frequented section of Grand Teton National Park. The easiest access to the lake is from the Paintbrush Canyon Trail descending from above a low saddle at a point west of there at approximately the  elevation, where the slopes to the north down to the lake are easiest.

References

Lakes of Grand Teton National Park